The following is a list of players, past and present, who have appeared in at least one competitive game for the Boston Red Sox American League franchise (founded in 1908), known previously as the Boston Americans (1901–07).

Players in bold are members of the National Baseball Hall of Fame.

Players in italics have had their numbers retired by the team.

Non-US players are indicated by the appropriate flag.



A

 David Aardsma
 Don Aase
 Andy Abad
 
 
 Jerry Adair
 Bob Adams
 Terry Adams
 Doc Adkins
 Benny Agbayani
 Harry Agganis
 Sam Agnew
 Rick Aguilera
 Matt Albers
 
 Dale Alexander
 
 
 Gary Allenson
 
 
 Nick Altrock
 
 Abe Alvarez
 Larry Andersen
 Brady Anderson
 Brian Anderson
 Fred Anderson
 Jimmy Anderson
 Lars Anderson
 Ernie Andres
 Kim Andrew
 Ivy Andrews
 Mike Andrews
 Shane Andrews
 Matt Andriese
 
 
 Pete Appleton
 
 Frank Arellanes
 
 Charlie Armbruster
 
 
 Bronson Arroyo
 Christian Arroyo
 Casper Asbjornson
 Billy Ashley
 Ken Aspromonte
 
 Scott Atchison
 James Atkins
 Elden Auker
 Leslie Aulds
 Steve Avery
 
 
 Mike Avilés

B

 Burke Badenhop
 Lore Bader
 
 Jim Bagby
 Andrew Bailey
 Bob Bailey
 Cory Bailey
 Gene Bailey
 Jeff Bailey
 Al Baker
 Floyd Baker
 Jack Baker
 Tracy Baker
 Rocco Baldelli
 Neal Ball
 Scott Bankhead
 Willie Banks
 Walter Barbare
 Frank Barberich
 Daniel Bard
 Josh Bard
 Brian Bark
 Brian Barkley
 Babe Barna
 Matt Barnes
 Steve Barr
 Bill Barrett
 Bob Barrett
 Frank Barrett
 Jimmy Barrett
 Marty Barrett
 Tom Barrett
 Ed Barry
 Jack Barry
 Steve Barr
 Aaron Bates
 Frank Baumann
 
 Don Baylor
 Bill Bayne
 
 Rod Beck
 Josh Beckett
 
 Hugh Bedient
 Jalen Beeks
 Stan Belinda
 Gary Bell
 
 Mark Bellhorn
 
 
 Andrew Benintendi
 
 Mike Benjamin
 Dennis Bennett
 Frank Bennett
 Al Benton
 Todd Benzinger
 Lou Berberet
 Moe Berg
 Boze Berger
 Charlie Berry
 Quintin Berry
 Sean Berry
 Damon Berryhill
 Mookie Betts
 Hal Bevan
 Ben Beville
 Jeff Bianchi
 Dante Bichette
 Elliot Bigelow
 Jack Billingham
 Doug Bird
 John Bischoff
 Max Bishop
 Dave Black
 Tim Blackwell
 Clarence Blethen
 Greg Blosser
 Red Bluhm
 Mike Boddicker
 Larry Boerner
 
 Wade Boggs
 Bobby Bolin
 Milt Bolling
 Tom Bolton
 Boof Bonser
 Ike Boone
 Ray Boone
 Toby Borland
 Tom Borland
 Lou Boudreau
 Michael Bowden
 Sam Bowen
 Stew Bowers
 Joe Bowman
 
 Oil Can Boyd
 Blaine Boyer
 Chad Bradford
 Herb Bradley
 Hugh Bradley
 Jackie Bradley Jr.
 Cliff Brady
 King Brady
 Darren Bragg
 Mark Brandenburg
 Bucky Brandon
 Ryan Brasier
 Fred Bratschi
 Bryce Brentz
 Craig Breslow
 Eddie Bressoud
 Ken Brett
 Colten Brewer
 Tom Brewer
 Austin Brice
 Ralph Brickner
 Jim Brillheart
 Drake Britton
 Dick Brodowski
 Rico Brogna
 Jack Brohamer
 Adrian Brown
 Corey Brown
 Dusty Brown
 Hal Brown
 Jamie Brown
 Kevin Brown
 Lloyd Brown
 Mace Brown
 Mike Brown
 Mike Brumley
 Tom Brunansky
 Jim Bucher
 Clay Buchholz
 Bill Buckner
 Don Buddin
 Damon Buford
 Kirk Bullinger
 Fred Burchell
 Bob Burda
 Tom Burgmeier
 Jesse Burkett
 John Burkett
 Morgan Burkhart
 Ellis Burks
 Rick Burleson
 George Burns
 Mike Burns
 Jim Burton
 Jim Busby
 Bullet Joe Bush
 Jack Bushelman
 Frank Bushey
 Bill Butland
 Dan Butler
 Bud Byerly
 Jim Byrd
 Marlon Byrd
 Paul Byrd

C

 
 
 Hick Cady
 
 Earl Caldwell
 Ray Caldwell
 Mike Cameron
 Dolph Camilli
 Bill Campbell
 Paul Campbell
 
 Chris Capuano
 Bernie Carbo
 Tom Carey
 
 Swede Carlstrom
 Cleo Carlyle
 Roy Carlyle
 Chris Carpenter
 
 Bill Carrigan
 Ed Carroll
 Mike Carp
 Chris Carter
 Jerry Casale
 Joe Cascarella
 Sean Casey
 Kevin Cash
 Andrew Cashner
 Scott Cassidy
 Carlos Castillo
 Frank Castillo
 
 Danny Cater
 Joey Gathright
 Garin Cecchini
 Rex Cecil
 
 
 Rick Cerone
 
 Chet Chadbourne
 Bob Chakales
 Wes Chamberlain
 Esty Chaney
 Ed Chaplin
 Ben Chapman
 Pete Charton
 Ken Chase
 
 Michael Chavis
 Charlie Chech
 
 
 Jack Chesbro
 Nelson Chittum
 
 
 Loyd Christopher
 Joe Cicero
 Eddie Cicotte
 Galen Cisco
 
 Bill Cissell
 Danny Clark
 Jack Clark
 Otey Clark
 Phil Clark
 Tony Clark
 Royce Clayton
 Mark Clear
 Roger Clemens
 Matt Clement
 Lance Clemons
 
 Tex Clevenger
 Lou Clinton
 Bill Clowers
 George Cochran
 Robert Coello
 Jack Coffey
 Alex Cole
 Dave Coleman
 Michael Coleman
 Lou Collier
 Jimmy Collins
 Ray Collins
 Rip Collins
 Shano Collins
 
 Merl Combs
 Ralph Comstock
 David Cone
 
 Billy Conigliaro
 Tony Conigliaro
 Gene Conley
 Bud Connolly
 Ed Connolly (C)
 Ed Connolly (P)
 Joe Connolly
 Bill Conroy
 Billy Consolo
 Aaron Cook
 Ryan Cook
 Dusty Cooke
 Jimmy Cooney
 Cecil Cooper
 Guy Cooper
 Scott Cooper
 
 
 
 Bryan Corey
 
 Vic Correll
 Jim Corsi
 Marlan Coughtry
 Fritz Coumbe
 Dylan Covey
 Ted Cox
 Allen Craig
 Doc Cramer
 Gavvy Cravath
 Carl Crawford
 Paxton Crawford
 Steve Crawford
 Pat Creeden
 Bob Cremins
 
 Lou Criger
 Coco Crisp
 Joe Cronin
 Zach Crouch
 Rich Croushore
 
 
 Leon Culberson
 Ray Culp
 
 George Cuppy
 Steve Curry
 John Curtis
 Milt Cuyler

D

 Babe Dahlgren
 Bobby Dalbec
 Pete Daley
 Dom Dallessandro
 Johnny Damon
 Babe Danzig
 Chase d'Arnaud
 Bobby Darwin
 Danny Darwin
 Brian Daubach
 Bob Daughters
 Rajai Davis
 Andre Dawson
 
 
 
 Cot Deal
 Rob Deer
 
 
 Manny Delcarmen
 
 Ike Delock
 Don Demeter
 
 Brian Denman
 Sam Dente
 Mike Derrick
 Gene Desautels
 Mel Deutsch
 
 Mickey Devine
 Hal Deviney
 Al DeVormer
 
 Jonathan Diaz
 
 George Dickey
 Emerson Dickman
 Bob Didier
 Steve Dillard
 Dom DiMaggio
 Lenny DiNardo
 Bill Dinneen
 Bob DiPietro
 Ray Dobens
 Joe Dobson
 Sam Dodge
 Pat Dodson
 Bobby Doerr
 John Doherty
 Andy Dominique
 John Donahue
 Pat Donahue
 Brendan Donnelly
 Chris Donnels
 Pete Donohue
 John Dopson
 Tom Doran
 Harry Dorish
 Jim Dorsey
 
 Patsy Dougherty
 Tommy Dowd
 Danny Doyle
 Denny Doyle
 Dick Drago
 Clem Dreisewerd
 J. D. Drew
 Stephen Drew
 Walt Dropo
 Jean Dubuc
 Frank Duffy
 Joe Dugan
 Bob Duliba
 George Dumont
 Jarren Duran
 Ed Durham
 Cedric Durst
 Jim Dwyer

E

 Arnold Earley
 Mike Easler
 Dennis Eckersley
 Elmer Eggert
 Howard Ehmke
 Hack Eibel
 
 Jacoby Ellsbury
 Dick Ellsworth
 Steve Ellsworth
 Alan Embree
 Clyde Engle
 Nathan Eovaldi
 Todd Erdos
 Nick Esasky
 Edwin Escobar
 Vaughn Eshelman
 Al Evans
 Bill Evans
 Dwight Evans
 Carl Everett
 Hoot Evers
 Homer Ezzell

F

 Carmen Fanzone
 Steve Farr
 Doc Farrell
 Duke Farrell
 Jeff Fassero
 Alex Ferguson
 Rick Ferrell
 Wes Ferrell
 Hobe Ferris
 Dave Ferriss
 Chick Fewster
 Joel Finch
 Tommy Fine
 Lou Finney
 Gar Finnvold
 Mike Fiore
 Hank Fischer
 Carlton Fisk
 Doug Fister
 Howie Fitzgerald
 Ira Flagstead
 John Flaherty
 Al Flair
 Bill Fleming
 Scott Fletcher
 Bryce Florie
 Ben Flowers
 Cliff Floyd
 Chad Fonville
 Frank Foreman
 Happy Foreman
 
 Gary Fortune
 
 Casey Fossum
 Eddie Foster
 Rube Foster
 Bob Fothergill
 Keith Foulke
 Boob Fowler
 Chad Fox
 Matt Fox
 Pete Fox
 Jimmie Foxx
 Joe Foy
 Ray Francis
 Buck Freeman
 Hersh Freeman
 John Freeman
 Charlie French
 Bernie Friberg
 Owen Friend
 Todd Frohwirth
 Jeff Frye
 Oscar Fuhr
 Frank Fuller
 Curt Fullerton

G

 Kason Gabbard
 Gary Gaetti
 Fabian Gaffke
 Phil Gagliano
 
 Del Gainer
 Rich Gale
 Denny Galehouse
 Ed Gallagher
 Bob Gallagher
 Jim Galvin
 Bob Garbark
 
 Nomar Garciaparra
 
 Billy Gardner
 Larry Gardner
 Wes Gardner
 Mike Garman
 Cliff Garrison
 Ford Garrison
 Alex Gaston
 Milt Gaston
 Joey Gathright
 Rich Gedman
 Gary Geiger
 Charlie Gelbert
 Wally Gerber
 Justin Germano
 Dick Gernert
 Doc Gessler
 Chappie Geygan
 Jeremy Giambi
 Joe Giannini
 Norwood Gibson
 Russ Gibson
 Andy Gilbert
 Don Gile
 Frank Gilhooley
 Bernard Gilkey
 Bob Gillespie
 Grant Gillis
 Joe Ginsberg
 Ralph Glaze
 Harry Gleason
 Joe Glenn
 John Godwin
 Zack Godley
 Chuck Goggin
 Jonny Gomes
 Wayne Gomes
 
 Joe Gonzales
 Adrián González
 
 
 
 
 
 Johnny Gooch
 Billy Goodman
 Tom Gordon
 Jim Gosger
 Tony Graffanino
 Charlie Graham
 Lee Graham
 Skinny Graham
 Dave Gray
 Jeff Gray
 Craig Grebeck
 Lenny Green
 Nick Green
 Pumpsie Green
 Mike Greenwell
 Vean Gregg
 Doug Griffin
 Marty Griffin
 Guido Grilli
 Ray Grimes
 Myron Grimshaw
 Marv Grissom
 Kip Gross
 Turkey Gross
 Lefty Grove
 
 Ken Grundt
 Creighton Gubanich
 
 
 Bobby Guindon
 Randy Gumpert
 Eric Gunderson
 Hy Gunning
 Mark Guthrie
 
 Ricky Gutiérrez
 Don Gutteridge

H

 Casey Hageman
 John Halama
 Odell Hale
 Justin Haley
 Raymond Haley
 Bill Hall
 Charley Hall
 Matt Hall
 Chris Hammond
 Garry Hancock
 Josh Hancock
 Chris Haney
 Fred Haney
 Ryan Hanigan
 Joel Hanrahan
 
 Craig Hansen
 Erik Hanson
 Carroll Hardy
 Tim Harikkala
 Harry Harper
 Tommy Harper
 Billy Harrell
 Ken Harrelson
 Bill Harris
 Greg Harris
 Joe Harris (1B)
 Joe Harris (P)
 Mickey Harris
 Reggie Harris
 Willie Harris
 Slim Harriss
 Jack Harshman
 Kyle Hart
 Chuck Hartenstein
 Grover Hartley
 Mike Hartley
 Charlie Hartman
 Chad Harville
 Bill Haselman
 Herb Hash
 Alex Hassan
 Andy Hassler
 Billy Hatcher
 Fred Hatfield
 Scott Hatteberg
 Grady Hatton
 Clem Hausmann
 Jack Hayden
 Frankie Hayes
 Ed Hearne
 Danny Heep
 Bob Heffner
 Randy Heflin
 Fred Heimach
 Bob Heise
 Tommy Helms
 Heath Hembree
 Charlie Hemphill
 Dave Henderson
 Rickey Henderson
 Tim Hendryx
 
 Bill Henry
 Butch Henry
 Jim Henry
 Dustin Hermanson
 Jeremy Hermida
 
 
 
 
 
 
 
 Tom Herrin
 Joe Hesketh
 Eric Hetzel
 Joe Heving
 Johnnie Heving
 Charlie Hickman
 Pinky Higgins
 Aaron Hill
 Rich Hill
 Shea Hillenbrand
 Hob Hiller
 Dave Hillman
 Gordie Hinkle
 
 Paul Hinrichs
 Eric Hinske
 Paul Hinson
 Harley Hisner
 Billy Hitchcock
 Dick Hoblitzel
 Butch Hobson
 George Hockette
 Johnny Hodapp
 Mel Hoderlein
 Billy Hoeft
 Jack Hoey
 Glenn Hoffman
 Fred Hofmann
 Bryan Holaday
 Ken Holcombe
 Dave Hollins
 Billy Holm
 Brock Holt
 Mike Holtz
 Harry Hooper
 Sam Horn
 Tony Horton
 Dwayne Hosey
 Tommy Hottovy
 Tanner Houck
 Tom House
 Wayne Housie
 Chris Howard
 Elston Howard
 Paul Howard
 Les Howe
 Bob Howry
 
 Waite Hoyt
 Ken Huckaby
 Joe Hudson
 Sid Hudson
 Ed Hughes
 Long Tom Hughes
 Terry Hughes
 Tex Hughson
 Byron Humphrey
 Ben Hunt
 Buddy Hunter
 Herb Hunter
 Tom Hurd
 Bruce Hurst
 Butch Huskey
 Bert Husting
 Adam Hyzdu

I
 
 Daryl Irvine

J

 Conor Jackson
 Damian Jackson
 Ron Jackson
 Baby Doll Jacobson
 Beany Jacobson
 Lefty Jamerson
 Big Bill James
 Chris James
 Hal Janvrin
 Kevin Jarvis
 Ray Jarvis
 Reggie Jefferson
 
 Tom Jenkins
 Bobby Jenks
 Jackie Jensen
 Marcus Jensen
 
 Keith Johns
 Brian Johnson
 Indian Bob Johnson
 Deron Johnson
 Earl Johnson
 Hank Johnson
 Jason Johnson
 John Henry Johnson
 Kelly Johnson
 Rankin Johnson
 Roy Johnson
 Vic Johnson
 Joel Johnston
 Smead Jolley
 Bobby M. Jones
 Charlie Jones
 Dalton Jones
 Hunter Jones
 Jake Jones
 Rick Jones
 Sad Sam Jones
 Todd Jones
 Eddie Joost
 Duane Josephson
 
 Joe Judge
 Ed Jurak

K

 Ryan Kalish
 Rudy Kallio
 Gabe Kapler
 Ed Karger
 Andy Karl
 Marty Karow
 Benn Karr
 Eddie Kasko
 George Kell
 Al Kellett
 Red Kellett
 Trevor Kelley
 
 Ed Kelly
 Joe Kelly
 Ken Keltner
 Russ Kemmerer
 Fred Kendall
 Kyle Kendrick
 Bill Kennedy
 John Kennedy
 Marty Keough
 Mike Kickham
 Dana Kiecker
 Joe Kiefer
 Bobby Kielty
 Leo Kiely
 Jack Killilay
 
 
 Craig Kimbrel
 Ellis Kinder
 Walt Kinney
 Ian Kinsler
 Bruce Kison
 Billy Klaus
 Red Kleinow
 Bob Kline
 Ron Kline
 Bob Klinger
 Brent Knackert
 John Knight
 Hal Kolstad
 Cal Koonce
 Andy Kosco
 Casey Kotchman
 Mark Kotsay
 
 Jack Kramer
 Lew Krausse Jr.
 Rick Kreuger
 Rube Kroh
 John Kroner
 
 Randy Kutcher

L

 Candy LaChance
 John Lackey
 Kerry Lacy
 
 Roger LaFrancois
 Joe Lahoud
 Eddie Lake
 Travis Lakins
 Jack Lamabe
 Bill Lamar
 Ryan LaMarre
 Dennis Lamp
 Rick Lancellotti
 Bill Landis
 Jim Landis
 Sam Langford
 Carney Lansford
 Mike Lansing
 Frank LaPorte
 Adam LaRoche
 John LaRose
 Lyn Lary
 Ryan Lavarnway
 Tommy Layne
 Johnny Lazor
 Bill Lee
 Dud Lee
 
 Bill Lefebvre
 Lou Legett
 Regis Leheny
 Paul Lehner
 Nemo Leibold
 John Leister
 Mark Lemke
 Don Lenhardt
 
 Dutch Leonard
 Ted Lepcio
 Dutch Lerchen
 Louis Leroy
 
 Curtis Leskanic
 Jon Lester
 Darren Lewis
 Duffy Lewis
 Jack Lewis
 
 Jim Leyritz
 John Lickert
 Pat Light
 Brent Lillibridge
 Derek Lilliquist
 
 
 Johnny Lipon
 Hod Lisenbee
 Dick Littlefield
 Greg Litton
 Don Lock
 Skip Lockwood
 George Loepp
 James Lofton
 Tim Lollar
 Steve Lomasney
 Jim Lonborg
 Walter Lonergan
 James Loney
 Brian Looney
 
 
 
 Harry Lord
 Mark Loretta
 Derek Lowe
 
 Jed Lowrie
 Johnny Lucas
 Joe Lucey
 Lou Lucier
 Jonathan Lucroy
 
 Del Lundgren
 Tony Lupien
 Sparky Lyle
 Walt Lynch
 Fred Lynn
 Brandon Lyon
 Steve Lyons

M

 Frank Malzone
 Deven Marrero
 Chris Mazza
 Dick McAuliffe
 Tom McBride
 Dick McCabe
 Windy McCall
 Emmett McCann
 
 David McCarty
 Tim McCarver
 Amby McConnell
 Mickey McDermott
 Allen McDill
 Darnell McDonald
 Jim McDonald
 John McDonald
 Ed McFarland
 Mike Macfarlane
 Danny MacFayden
 Eddie McGah
 Willie McGee
 Lynn McGlothen
 
 Bob McGraw
 Deacon McGuire
 
 Jim McHale
 Marty McHale
 Stuffy McInnis
 Shane Mack
 Archie McKain
 Walt McKeel
 Jud McLaughlin
 
 Billy MacLeod
 Doc McMahon
 Don McMahon
 Marty McManus
 Norm McMillan
 Eric McNair
 Mike McNally
 Gordon McNaughton
 Jeff McNeely
 Norm McNeil
 Keith MacWhorter
 
 Bill McWilliams
 Bunny Madden
 Austin Maddox
 Mike Maddux
 Pete Magrini
 Ron Mahay
 Pat Mahomes
 Chris Mahoney
 Jim Mahoney
 Mark Malaska
 
 Jerry Mallett
 Paul Maloy
 Matt Mantei
 
 Jeff Manto
 Robert Manuel
 Heinie Manush *
 
 
 Johnny Marcum
 
 Ollie Marquardt
 Bill Marshall
 Mike Marshall
 Babe Martin
 Kyle Martin
 
 J.D. Martinez
 
 
 
 
 
 John Marzano
 
 Walt Masterson
 Tom Matchick
 
 William Matthews
 Gene Mauch
 Charlie Maxwell
 Wally Mayer
 Chick Maynard
 Carl Mays
 
 Mark Melancon
 Sam Mele
 
 Ski Melillo
 Bob Melvin
 
 
 Mike Menosky
 Mike Meola
 
 Andy Merchant
 Kent Mercker
 Cla Meredith
 Spike Merena
 Lou Merloni
 Jack Merson
 Catfish Metkovich
 Russ Meyer
 John Michaels
 Will Middlebrooks
 Dick Midkiff
 Doug Mientkiewicz
 Dee Miles
 Wade Miley
 Kevin Millar
 Andrew Miller
 Bing Miller
 Corky Miller
 Elmer Miller
 Hack Miller
 Mike Miller
 Otto Miller
 Rick Miller
 Trever Miller
 Wade Miller
 Buster Mills
 Dick Mills
 Rudy Minarcin
 Nate Minchey
 Doug Mirabelli
 Charlie Mitchell
 Fred Mitchell
 Johnny Mitchell
 Keith Mitchell
 Kevin Mitchell
 Herb Moford
 Dustan Mohr
 
 Vince Molyneaux
 Bill Monbouquette
 
 Freddie Moncewicz
 Bob Montgomery
 Bill Moore
 Wilcy Moore
 
 Dave Morehead
 Mitch Moreland
 
 Cy Morgan
 Ed Morgan
 Red Morgan
 Ed Morris
 Frank Morrissey
 Clayton Mortensen
 Guy Morton Jr.
 Kevin Morton
 Earl Moseley
 Walter Moser
 Jerry Moses
 Wally Moses
 Doc Moskiman
 Brandon Moss
 Les Moss
 Jamie Moyer
 Bill Mueller
 Gordie Mueller
 Billy Muffett
 
 Greg Mulleavy
 Freddie Muller
 Joe Mulligan
 Frank Mulroney
 Bill Mundy
 
 David Murphy
 Johnny Murphy
 Rob Murphy
 Tom Murphy
 Walter Murphy
 George Murray
 Matt Murray
 Tony Muser
 Paul Musser
 Alex Mustaikis
 Buddy Myer
 Elmer Myers
 Hap Myers
 Mike Myers

N

 Chris Nabholz
 Tim Naehring
 Judge Nagle
 Mike Nagy
 Mike Napoli
 Bill Narleski
 Daniel Nava
 
 Blaine Neal
 Ernie Neitzke
 Bry Nelson
 Joe Nelson
 Hal Neubauer
 Don Newhauser
 Jeff Newman
 Bobo Newsom
 Dick Newsome
 Skeeter Newsome
 Gus Niarhos
 Chet Nichols Jr.
 Reid Nichols
 Al Niemiec
 Harry Niles
 Al Nipper
 Merlin Nippert
 Otis Nixon
 Russ Nixon
 Trot Nixon
 Willard Nixon
 
 Red Nonnenkamp
 Chet Nourse
 Les Nunamaker
 
 Jon Nunnally

O

 Mike O'Berry
 Buck O'Brien
 Jack O'Brien
 Syd O'Brien
 Tommy O'Brien
 Lefty O'Doul
 Troy O'Leary
 
 Emmett O'Neill
 Steve O'Neill
 
 Sean O'Sullivan
 Frank Oberlin
 
 
 
 
 Bob Ojeda
 
 Len Okrie
 John Olerud
 Darren Oliver
 Gene Oliver
 Joe Oliver
 Tom Oliver
 Hank Olmsted
 Karl Olson
 Marv Olson
 Ted Olson
 Steve Ontiveros
 George Orme
 
 
 Josh Osich
 Dan Osinski
 Harry Ostdiek
 Fritz Ostermueller
 Johnny Ostrowski
 Adam Ottavino
 Marv Owen
 Mickey Owen
 Spike Owen
 
 Henry Owens
 Chris Owings

P

  Vicente Padilla
 Jim Pagliaroni
 Mike Palm
 Jim Pankovits
 Al Papai
 Larry Pape
 Jonathan Papelbon
 Stan Papi
 Freddy Parent
 Mel Parnell
 Larry Parrish
 Roy Partee
 Stan Partenheimer
 Ben Paschal
 Case Patten
 Eric Patterson
 Hank Patterson
 Marty Pattin
 David Pauley
 Don Pavletich
 Mike Paxton
 Jay Payton
 Johnny Peacock
 Steve Pearce
 Dustin Pedroia
 
 Eddie Pellagrini
 
 Brad Penny
 
 
 
 
 
 
 Brad Pennington
 Herb Pennock
 
 
 
 Matt Perisho
 John Perrin
 Robert Person
 Bill Pertica
 Johnny Pesky
 
 Gary Peters
 Bob Peterson
 Rico Petrocelli
 Dan Petry
 Dave Philley
 Brandon Phillips
 Ed Phillips
 
 Val Picinich
 
 Urbane Pickering
 Jeff Pierce
 Bill Piercy
 Jim Piersall
 A. J. Pierzynski
 Kevin Pillar
 
 George Pipgras
 Greg Pirkl
 Pinky Pittenger
 Nick Pivetta
 
 Kevin Plawecki
 Phil Plantier
 Herb Plews
 Jeff Plympton
 Scott Podsednik
 Jennings Poindexter
 Dick Pole
 Nick Polly
 Drew Pomeranz
 Ralph Pond
 Tom Poquette
 Rick Porcello
 Dick Porter
 Bob Porterfield
 Mark Portugal
 Nels Potter
 Ken Poulsen
 Bobby Poyner
 
 Del Pratt
 Larry Pratt
 George Prentiss
 David Price
 Joe Price
 Curtis Pride
 Doc Prothro
 Tex Pruiett
 
 Bill Pulsipher
 Nick Punto
 Billy Purtell
 Frankie Pytlak

Q

 
 Frank Quinn
 Jack Quinn

R

 Dick Radatz
 Dave Rader
 Chuck Rainey
 
 
 
 Noe Ramirez
 
 Anthony Ranaudo
 Pat Rapp
 Jeff Reardon
 
 Josh Reddick
 Addison Reed
 Jerry Reed
 Jody Reed
 Pokey Reese
 Bobby Reeves
 Bill Regan
 Wally Rehg
 Dick Reichle
 Mike Remlinger
 
 Jerry Remy
 Tony Renda
 Hunter Renfroe
 Steve Renko
 Bill Renna
 
 Jason Repko
 Rip Repulski
 Carlos Reyes
 
 Carl Reynolds
 Gordon Rhodes
 Karl Rhodes
 Hal Rhyne
 Jim Rice
 Woody Rich
 Garrett Richards
 Dustin Richardson
 Jeff Richardson
 Al Richter
 Joe Riggert
 Topper Rigney
 Ernest Riles
 Allen Ripley
 Walt Ripley
 Pop Rising
 David Riske
 Jay Ritchie
 
 
 
 Ryan Roberts
 Billy Jo Robidoux
 Aaron Robinson
 Floyd Robinson
 Jack Robinson
 Mike Rochford
 Bill Rodgers
 
 
 Frankie Rodríguez
 Steve Rodríguez
 
 Billy Rogell
 Lee Rogers
 Garry Roggenburk
 Billy Rohr
 Red Rollings
 
 
 Mandy Romero
 
 Kevin Romine
 
 Buddy Rosar
 Brian Rose
 Si Rosenthal
 Buster Ross
 Cody Ross
 David Ross
 Robbie Ross Jr.
 Braggo Roth
 Jack Rothrock
 Rich Rowland
 Stan Royer
 Joe Rudi
 Muddy Ruel
 Red Ruffing
 Pete Runnels
 Ryan Rupe
 Allan Russell
 Jack Russell
 Jeff Russell
 Rip Russell
 Babe Ruth
 Josh Rutledge
 Jack Ryan (OF)
 Jack Ryan (P)
 Ken Ryan
 Mike Ryan
 Mike Ryba
 Gene Rye

S

 Bret Saberhagen
 Donnie Sadler
 Bob Sadowski
 Ed Sadowski
 
 Chris Sale
 Jarrod Saltalamacchia
 Joe Sambito
 
 Freddy Sánchez
 
 Ken Sanders
 
 
 
 
 
 Tom Satriano
 Scott Sauerbeck
 
 Dave Sax
 Bill Sayles
 Ray Scarborough
 Russ Scarritt
 Wally Schang
 Charley Schanz
 Bob Scherbarth
 Kyle Schwarber
 Chuck Schilling
 Curt Schilling
 Calvin Schiraldi
 Rudy Schlesinger
 Biff Schlitzer
 George Schmees
 Dave Schmidt
 Johnny Schmitz
 Scott Schoeneweis
 Dick Schofield
 Pete Schourek
 Ossee Schreckengost
 Al Schroll
 Don Schwall
 Everett Scott
 George Scott
 Robby Scott
 
 Rudy Seánez
 Tom Seaver
 Bob Seeds
 
 Phil Seibel
 Kip Selbach
 Bill Selby
 Aaron Sele
 Jeff Sellers
 Steve Selsky
 Merle Settlemire
 Wally Shaner
 Howie Shanks
 Red Shannon
 
 Travis Shaw
 Mike Shawaryn
 John Shea
 Merv Shea
 Danny Sheaffer
 Ryan Shealy
 Dave Shean
 Andy Sheets
 Rollie Sheldon
 Keith Shepherd
 Neill Sheridan
 Ben Shields
 Jason Shiell
 Strick Shofner
 Kelly Shoppach
 Ernie Shore
 Bill Short
 Chick Shorten
 Brian Shouse
 Terry Shumpert
 Norm Siebern
 Sonny Siebert
 Al Simmons
 Pat Simmons
 Dave Sisler
 Grady Sizemore
 Ted Sizemore
 Camp Skinner
 Craig Skok
 Jack Slattery
 Steve Slayton
 Heathcliff Slocumb
 Charlie Small
 Al Smith
 Aleck Smith
 Bob G. Smith
 Bob W. Smith
 Carson Smith
 Charlie Smith
 Chris Smith
 Dan Smith
 Doug Smith
 Eddie Smith
 Elmer Smith
 Frank Smith
 George Smith (2B)
 George Smith (P)
 John Smith
 Josh Smith
 Lee Smith
 Paddy Smith
 Pete Smith
 Reggie Smith
 Zane Smith
 Mike Smithson
 John Smoltz
 Wally Snell
 Chris Snopek
 J. T. Snow
 Brandon Snyder
 Earl Snyder
 Kyle Snyder
 Moose Solters
 Rudy Sommers
 Allen Sothoron
 Bill Spanswick
 Tully Sparks
 Tris Speaker
 Nate Spears
 Stan Spence
 Tubby Spencer
 Andy Spognardi
 Ed Sprague
 Jack Spring
 Jeffrey Springs
 Bobby Sprowl
 Chick Stahl
 Jake Stahl
 
 Tracy Stallard
 Jerry Standaert
 Lee Stange
 Rob Stanifer
 Bob Stanley
 Mike Stanley
 Jack Stansbury
 Mike Stanton
 Dave Stapleton
 Jigger Statz
 Elmer Steele
 Ben Steiner
 Red Steiner
 Mike Stenhouse
 Gene Stephens
 Vern Stephens
 Jerry Stephenson
 
 Sammy Stewart
 Zach Stewart
 Dick Stigman
 Carl Stimson
 Chuck Stobbs
 Robert Stock
 Al Stokes
 Dean Stone
 George Stone
 Jeff Stone
 Howie Storie
 Lou Stringer
 Amos Strunk
 Dick Stuart
 George Stumpf
 Tom Sturdivant
 Chris Stynes
 Jim Suchecki
 Denny Sullivan
 Frank Sullivan
 Haywood Sullivan
 Marc Sullivan
 Carl Sumner
 Jeff Suppan
 George Susce
 Drew Sutton
 Bill Swanson
 Bill Sweeney
 Ryan Sweeney
 Blake Swihart
 Greg Swindell
 Len Swormstedt

T

 Jim Tabor
 Doug Taitt
 Frank Tanana
 Jesse Tannehill
 
 Arlie Tarbert
 
 La Schelle Tarver
 Willie Tasby
 Bennie Tate
 Jim Tatum
 Ken Tatum
 
 
 Ben Taylor
 Harry Taylor
 Josh Taylor
 Scott Taylor
 
 Birdie Tebbetts
 Yank Terry
 Jake Thielman
 Blaine Thomas
 Fred Thomas
 George Thomas
 Justin Thomas
 Lee Thomas
 Pinch Thomas
 Tommy Thomas
 
 Jack Thoney
 Hank Thormahlen
 Tyler Thornburg
 Matt Thornton
 Faye Throneberry
 Joe Thurston
 
 Bob Tillman
 Mike Timlin
 Lee Tinsley
 Jack Tobin
 Johnny Tobin
 Phil Todt
 Kevin Tolar
 Andy Tomberlin
 Tony Tonneman
 Mike Torrez
 Billy Traber
 John Trautwein
 Sam Travis
 Andrew Triggs
 Joe Trimble
 Ricky Trlicek
 Dizzy Trout
 Frank Truesdale
 Mike Trujillo
 John Tudor
 Bob Turley

U

 
 Tom Umphlett
 Bob Unglaub

V

 Tex Vache
 
 
 
 
 Danny Valencia
 John Valentin
 Dave Valle
 Jermaine Van Buren
 Al Van Camp
 Ben Van Dyke
 Tim Van Egmond
 Jonathan Van Every
 Hy Vandenberg
 Jason Varitek
 Anthony Varvaro
 Mo Vaughn
 
 
 Bobby Veach
 Bob Veale
 
 Gil Velazquez
 
 
 Alex Verdugo
 Mickey Vernon
 Sammy Vick
 Shane Victorino
 
 Frank Viola
 Ossie Vitt
 Clyde Vollmer
 Jake Volz
 Joe Vosmik

W

 Jake Wade
 Billy Wagner
 Charlie Wagner
 Gary Wagner
 Hal Wagner
 Heinie Wagner
 Tim Wakefield
 Rube Walberg
 Marcus Walden
 Chico Walker
 Tilly Walker
 Todd Walker
 Murray Wall
 
 Bucky Walters
 Fred Walters
 Roxy Walters
 Bill Wambsganss
 Pee-Wee Wanninger
 John Warner
 Rabbit Warstler
 John Wasdin
 Gary Waslewski
 Bob Watson
 Johnny Watwood
 Monte Weaver
 Earl Webb
 Ryan Weber
 Allen Webster
 Lenny Webster
 Ray Webster
 Eric Wedge
 Jemile Weeks
 Bob Weiland
 Kyle Weiland
 Frank Welch
 Herb Welch
 Johnny Welch
 David Wells
 
 Fred Wenz
 Billy Werber
 Bill Werle
 Vic Wertz
 David West
 Dan Wheeler
 Matt White
 Sammy White
 George Whiteman
 Mark Whiten
 Garrett Whitlock
 Ernie Whitt
 Al Widmar
 Bill Wight
 Del Wilber
 Joe Wilhoit
 Dana Williams
 Dave Williams
 Denny Williams
 Dib Williams
 Dick Williams
 Ken Williams
 Randy Williams
 Rip Williams
 Stan Williams
 Ted Williams
 Scott Williamson
 Jim Willoughby
 Ted Wills
 Alex Wilson
 Archie Wilson
 Duane Wilson
 Earl Wilson
 Gary Wilson
 George F. Wilson
 Jack Wilson
 Jim Wilson
 John Wilson
 Les Wilson
 Hal Wiltse
 Ted Wingfield
 George Winn
 Herm Winningham
 Tom Winsett
 George Winter
 Clarence Winters
 Rick Wise
 Johnnie Wittig
 Bob Wolcott
 Larry Wolfe
 Harry Wolter
 Connor Wong
 Joe Wood
 Smoky Joe Wood
 Ken Wood
 Wilbur Wood
 Steve Woodard
 John Woods
 Pinky Woods
 Chris Woodward
 Rob Woodward
 Shawn Wooten
 Brandon Workman
 Hoge Workman
 Al Worthington
 Jim Wright
 Steven Wright
 Tom Wright
 John Wyatt
 Weldon Wyckoff

Y

 Carl Yastrzemski
 Steve Yerkes
 Rudy York
 Kevin Youkilis
 Chris Young
 Cy Young
 Matt Young
 Tim Young

Z

 Paul Zahniser
 Al Zarilla
 Norm Zauchin
 Matt Zeiser
 Brad Ziegler
 Charlie Zink
 Bill Zuber
 Bob Zupcic

Nationality breakdown
 1848 players

See also
 History of the Boston Red Sox
 List of Boston Red Sox managers
 Boston Red Sox coaches
 List of Boston Red Sox captains
 List of Boston Red Sox broadcasters

External links
 BR batting statistics
 BR pitching statistics

Roster
Major League Baseball all-time rosters